Bogra-6 is a constituency represented in the Jatiya Sangsad (National Parliament) of Bangladesh since 2023 is Ragebul Ahsan Ripu. As the Member of Parliament, Mirza Fakhrul Islam Alamgir of the Bangladesh Nationalist Party refused to take the oath.

Boundaries 
The constituency encompasses Bogra Sadar Upazila.

History 
The constituency was created for the first general elections in newly independent Bangladesh, held in 1973.

Members of Parliament 
Key

Elections

Elections in the 2010s 
Nurul Islam Omar was elected unopposed in the 2014 general election after opposition parties withdrew their candidacies in a boycott of the election.

Elections in the 2000s 
Khaleda Zia stood for three seats in the 2008 general election: Bogra-6, Bogra-7, and Feni-1. After winning all three, she chose to represent Feni-1 and quit the other two, triggering by-elections in them. Muhammad Jamiruddin Sircar of the BNP was elected in an April 2009 by-election.

Elections in the 1990s 
Khaleda Zia stood for five seats in the June 1996 general election: Bogra-6, Bogra-7, Feni-1, Lakshmipur-2 and Chittagong-1. After winning all five, she chose to represent Feni-1 and quit the other four, triggering by-elections in them. Md. Zahurul Islam of the BNP was elected in a September 1996 by-election.

References

External links
 

Parliamentary constituencies in Bangladesh
Bogura District